An ethical decision is one that engenders trust, and thus indicates responsibility, fairness and caring to an individual. To be ethical, one has to demonstrate respect, and responsibility. Ethical decision-making requires a review of different options, eliminating those with an unethical standpoint, and then choosing the best ethical alternative.

Ethics vs. morals 

The words "Ethics" and "Morals" are frequently used interchangeably and relate to the "wrong" and "right" conduct.  Ethics refer to behavior customary in a culture or society, whereas Morals refer to personal standards of right and wrong. Morals do not change as a person moves from one society to the next, while ethics could change with the addition and loss of community members.  Business ethics is associated with the creation and application of moral standards in a business setting.

Development of ethical decision-making 

Ethical decisions come from a place of conscience. For many, conscience is simply an internal source of reward and punishment. But according to researcher Lawrence Kohlberg, conscience is only one of several ways in which ethical values are represented in the personality. Kohlberg believes there are higher levels of moral development and these are acquired in three stages.

Ethical decision-making in eastern religions 

Traditions, such as Confucianism, animism, Hinduism, Buddhism, and Taoism, have had a similar impact on their cultures. However, they all tend to emphasize different aspects of decisions than does Western academic ethics, which is said to suffer badly from a "God's Eye view" problem. By contrast, these non-Western traditions have emphasized the following:

Trust relationships 

Trust relationships are the foundations of all ethical decisions. One must learn what is good and ethical from some role model or moral example. Religion often raises certain stories about certain people to this level deliberately.

Social principles may apply even when one's decision is isolated to only themselves. For instance we can look at the individual as a collective of identities - a common example is ego and alter-ego. Also one might employ principles like Kant's categorical imperative.

Consistent description 

All ethical and moral judgement attempts to make consistent descriptions of complex situations and difficult decisions.  It is considered to be important because, to those who practice the ethical tradition in which the descriptions are applied, it answers the big question: "How should we live?"

The very questions presupposes that we can define "how" (method), "should" (ambition), "we" (a group seeking consensus), "live" (beings with bodies).

Without this context, ethics is generally just talk implying moral judgement - called normative ethics, and covered again in separate article.

The remainder of this article is about practical approaches to ethical decisions that are observed in ordinary people's daily lives and in politics in particular:

De-escalating 

An ethical decision is often thought of as the one that reduces future conflict.  In sociology and political science, practical and applied ethics itself is often defined as a process of de-escalating moral conflicts to the point of:
 non-violent resolution,
 reducing harm, and
 educating as required so that each participant in a conflict can effectively see the other's point of view
At this point the conflict is unlikely to recur.

Avoiding right vs. wrong 

Without this, we fall back to the simplistic view, which is "I am right and you are wrong and you do what I say." (This is usually called moral absolutism).  This kind of assertion, backed by force, is the basis of much authority and it leads to violence very often.  So much so that it turns out not to be the simplest way to live among humans in the long run, even if it is accepted by small groups (say a whole family) in the short run. However we must also be careful of the opposite - absolute moral relativism, which simply dismisses the concept of ethics entirely by stating there is no such thing as certain rightness.

Right versus right 

A simple, practical view is that ethics balances "right versus right":  if there's a dispute we care to hear, then each side must have some right on it.  However, this presupposes some instinctive moral core of the individual that must recognize right and wrong, else we do not have two individuals asserting "right" and requiring ethical help:  if either in fact secretly believes themselves "wrong" then they are engaging in tactics to reduce the chance of getting caught or alerting others to it, neither of which is studied by ethics.

An environment or context 

Ethics can thus be viewed as a lever but one that rests on a moral fulcrum of pre-existing assumptions, like the bodies of the beings in conflict, placed there by circumstances, environments, situations, mostly out of their control – only the choice of resolution is under their own control.  When the environment or context has some status in the decision, as in ecological ethics, there is said to be a situated ethics. This is not the same as situational ethics which is about single decisions unlikely to recur.

Basis for ethical decisions 
Various factors are in play when making decisions. In terms of ethics, the following are significant:

Organizational or group codes

Castes or groups in society may have their own moral syndromes that simplify the types of decisions they make, e.g. as professionals in a commercial or governmental field.  Jane Jacobs claims there are two irreconcilable moral syndromes that arise from those contrasting views:
 Guardian syndrome
 Trader syndrome

Paul Adler defined markets, hierarchies, and communities as three different ways to resolve and make an ethical decision.  While Jacobs denied that collusion or collaboration between the syndromes could be constructive, and called any confusion of the two a "monstrous moral hybrid", Adler thought that "Communities" could do this without corruption.  By Jacobs' definition the community itself might be a source of corruption.

Family influences

George Lakoff's theory of moral politics states that these arise from family role differences ultimately, with a moral code emphasizing the logos or "rule" of the father as being the source of the motivations of the political "right", and one emphasizing the more merciful modern or mother-like view as being moral source for the "left".

Castes

One solution is castes:  people are raised to make decisions in particular ways based on their family traditions which are drawn from professional traditions.  Then people take on the profession for which they are best prepared.  This addresses the problem raised above, that the simplest ways to make 'ethical decisions tend to conflict.  But of course then the choice of profession is not up to the person but the family or the society around them.

Political parties

Without such a system, differences may evolve into some full system of community consensus or politics:

Politics, as Bernard Crick put it, is "ethics carried out in public".  His list of political virtues is an attempt to frame politics as a form of ethics, and ethics as a form of conflict resolution.

A political party for instance in democracy helps those who see ethical decisions the same way, form groups to promote those criteria for decisions that they see as most important.

Commonalities

Most surviving societies recognize certain acts that are usually bad for the society, such as lying, stealing, murder of people, adultery, and impiety (to God or Nature which in early societies was often the same).

Seeking safety

Sociologists and anthropologists believe that there is a tendency in most societies to support:
 belief and safety over doubt and risk,
 fairness, consent and duty over dissent,
 knowledge instead of ignorance,
 trust and honesty over lying
 to be against what the culture considers evil.

It is actually not possible to use any of those words without moral judgements – possibly judgments inherited from the dictionary – this is studied in meta-ethics and in descriptive ethics also.

Since all surviving societies must protect helpless people like elders, children, and pregnant women, it is likely that these concepts are defined more with reference to those helpless people than to others – that is, those with power have a duty to protect the helpless.

Right to thrive

One nearly-universal moral principle is some form of the golden rule: "Act towards other people as you would want others to act towards you."  Another principle is that a person can only be blamed or praised if they could choose to act or refuse to act.  Another is that there seems to be something good about helping living things in general, or compassion or empathy.

It is useful to distinguish "good from bad" in our actions just as we might distinguish "good from evil" morally in our thoughts.  It's also useful to recognize that we use the word "right" to assert what we are due and to judge what is correct.  To anything that's alive, it's "right" for it to live, that too is built into the body.  If a creature is physically fit and capable of thriving in its environment, it takes a lot to overcome a preference to live.

See also 
 Business ethics
 Ethical code
 Outline of ethics

References 

Ethics